Sheriff Cliffs is a set of cliffs rising to about 1,750 m to the west of Gabbro Crest, Saratoga Table, in the Forrestal Range, Pensacola Mountains. Named by Advisory Committee on Antarctic Names (US-ACAN) in 1979 after Steven D. Sheriff, geologist, Western Washington State University, Bellingham, WA, who worked in this area, 1978–79.

Cliffs of Queen Elizabeth Land